Nikon the "Metanoite" (Nikon ho Metanoeite (Nikon "repent!"; born circa 930, died 998) was a Byzantine monk, itinerant preacher, and Christian Orthodox saint. Perhaps Nikon's most notable historical impact, according to historian Andrew Louth, was his Life, the biography of Nikon written after his death by a successor abbot in his monastery, focused on the re-Christianizing of reconquered sections of the Byzantine Empire. It is also special in its references of localities in Crete and the central Greek mainland. Nikon himself was special in that he was represented as a missionary monk, one who was constantly preaching rather than constantly praying.

Biography
Nikon, of Greek origin, was born in Pontus (modern north-eastern Turkey) or in Argos. When he was young, Nikon went to a monastery known as Khrysopetro ("Golden Stone") located on the borders of Pontus and Paphlagonia. He spent twelve years there, living an ascetic life of prayer and penance, so extreme that his brothers tried to persuade him to lessen his regimen. His abbot, impressed by his spiritual conferences and worried that his newly returned father would draw him from the ascetic life, sent him out into the world to preach. After his departure, he traveled to Asia Minor and preached repentance there for three years before moving on. Following the expulsion of the Arabs from Crete in 961 by Nikephoros Phokas, he became active as a missionary preacher on the island, struggling to return recent converts of Islam back to Christianity. The area had been a Muslim emirate since the 820s, and in that time Christianity in the area weakened, many former Christians having been forcibly converted to Islam and remained fearful that they could face execution for the Hudood crime of apostasy by extremists or by a return of Arab soldiers. Even those who remained faithful to Christianity had somewhat lost contact with the living tradition, churches and monasteries having fallen into decay. The people in the region were, quoted from Nikon's biography, not Islamic, but rather Christians who had been corrupted "by time and long fellowship with the Saracens." Nikon was forced to change his tactics on Crete, now having to use his wit to lead his listeners to repentance, rather than just preaching the message of repentance. It was there that he acquired the nickname metanoite (Greek for "penitent/repent") for his habit of using it as a preface to all his sermons.

After spending five years on Crete, Nikon went on to Epidauros, Athens, and Euboea. He then travelled to Thebes and Corinth, and finally down into the Peloponnese, particularly to Sparta, which he reputably saved from a plague. While in Sparta, Nikon constructed three churches and a monastery and continued his preaching and teachings, which were reportedly confirmed by miracles. The Peloponnese is represented as a land full of demons, of which Nikon is constantly struggling against. He ended his life in mainland Greece, in the province of Lakonia, where he exerted considerable influence on both clergy and laity, founding a large number of churches. As a result, after his sanctification by the Greek Orthodox Church, he eventually became patron saint of the town of Sparta and the region of the Mani Peninsula (southern part of Ancient Sparta) where he brought Christianity to Mani and preached it to the Maniots. The Maniots began to convert to Christianity in the 9th century AD, but it wasn't until 200 years later in the 11th century AD that the Maniots had fully accepted Christianity. His feast is celebrated each year on November 26. After thirty or so years of preaching in the Peloponnese, he died in a monastery there on November 26, 998. According to his biography, Nikon continued to grant miracles posthumously, in fact, much of the account deals solely with these posthumous miracles. Nikon is pictured in mosaics in the monastery of Hosios Loukas, or Saint Luke.

Legacy
As a result of his actions, after his sanctification by the Eastern Orthodox Church he became the patron saint of the city of Sparta. His holiday is celebrated there annually on 26 November.

References

Sources

 

10th-century births
10th-century Byzantine monks
930s births
998 deaths
Eastern Orthodox monks
Greek Christian monks
Eastern Orthodox Christians from the Byzantine Empire
Saints from Anatolia
10th-century Christian saints
Byzantine Crete
Saints of medieval Greece
People of medieval Crete